Epithelantha micromeris is a button cactus in the genus Epithelantha, found in Arizona, New Mexico, Texas and northeast Mexico. It is characterized by its white-grey spines growing on a globular shaped stem.  The density of its white spines give it the illusion of being completely grey, making it very difficult to see the green color beneath. It grows to be 1–5 cm tall, and roughly 2–4 cm in diameter.  E. micromeris produces small, pink-white flowers, often considered to be some of the smallest of the cacti.  These flowers give way to a bright red, cylindrical fruit which contains several black seeds and also is edible.

References

Cactoideae
Flora of Arizona
Flora of the South-Central United States
Flora of Northeastern Mexico